National Secondary Route 117, or just Route 117 (or ) is a National Road Route of Costa Rica, located in the San José, Heredia provinces.

Description
In San José province the route covers Tibás canton (San Juan, Anselmo Llorente districts), Moravia canton (San Vicente district).

In Heredia province the route covers Santo Domingo canton (San Miguel, Tures districts).

References

Highways in Costa Rica